Yuri Lvovich Averbakh (8 February 1922 – 7 May 2022) was a Russian chess grandmaster and author. He was chairman of the USSR Chess Federation from 1973 to 1978. He was the first centenarian FIDE Grandmaster. Despite his eyesight and hearing having worsened, by his 100th birthday he continued to devote time to chess-related activities.

Early life
Averbakh was born in Kaluga, Russia. His father was German Jewish, and his ancestors were named Auerbach, meaning "meadow brook". His mother was Russian. Both sets of grandparents disapproved of their marriage because his father was likely an atheist and his mother was Eastern Orthodox, as well as the fact that his maternal grandmother died very young, so his mother was expected to look after the family. Averbakh called himself a fatalist.

Career

Tournament successes
His first major success was the first place in the Moscow Championship of 1949, ahead of players including Andor Lilienthal, Yakov Estrin and Vladimir Simagin. He became an international grandmaster in 1952. In 1954 he won the USSR Championship ahead of players including Mark Taimanov, Viktor Korchnoi, Tigran Petrosian, Efim Geller and Salo Flohr. In the 1956 Championship, he came equal first with Taimanov and Boris Spassky in the main event, finishing second after the playoff. Later Averbakh's daughter, Jane, would marry Taimanov. Averbakh's other major tournament victories included Vienna 1961 and Moscow 1962. He qualified for the 1953 Candidates' Tournament (the last stage to determine the challenger to the World Chess Champion), finishing joint tenth of the fifteen participants. He also qualified for the 1958 Interzonal tournament at Portorož, by finishing in fourth place at the 1958 USSR Championship at Riga. At Portorož, he wound up in a tie for seventh through eleventh places, half a point short of advancing to the Candidates' Tournament. He played in the 1993 Maccabiah Games in Israel, coming in fourth.

Playing style
His solid style was difficult for many pure attackers to overcome, as he wrote: "...Nezhmetdinov, who if he had the attack, could kill anybody, including Tal. But my score against him was something like 8½–½ because I did not give him any possibility for an active game. In such cases he would immediately start to spoil his position because he was looking for complications."

He had plus records against the world champions Max Euwe and Tigran Petrosian.

Writings
Averbakh was also a major endgame study theorist. More than 100 studies were published during his lifetime, many of which have made notable contributions to endgame theory. In 1956, he was given by FIDE the title of International Judge of Chess Compositions and in 1969 that of International Arbiter.

Averbakh was also an important chess journalist and author. He edited the Soviet chess periodicals Shakhmaty v SSSR and Shakhmatny Bulletin. From 1956 to 1962 he edited (with Vitaly Chekhover and others) a four-volume anthology on the endgame, Shakhmatnye okonchaniya (revised in 1980–84 and translated as Comprehensive Chess Endings, in five volumes).

Openings contributions

Averbakh is the eponym of several opening variations. 
King's Indian Defence: Averbakh variation (E73): 1.d4 Nf6 2.c4 g6 3.Nc3 Bg7 4.e4 d6 5.Be2 0-0 6.Bg5
King's Indian Defence: semi-Averbakh system (E73): 1.d4 Nf6 2.c4 g6 3.Nc3 Bg7 4.e4 d6 5.Be2 0-0 6.Be3
Modern Defense: Averbakh variation (A42): 1.d4 g6 2.c4 Bg7 3.Nc3 d6 4.e4
Ruy Lopez: Averbakh variation (C87): 1.e4 e5 2.Nf3 Nc6 3.Bb4 a6 4.Ba4 Nf6 5. 0-0 Be7 6. Re1 d6

Death and tributes
Averbakh was born on 8 February 1922, in Kaluga, and died on 7 May 2022, in Moscow. Averbakh is survived by a daughter, who was married to Mark Taimanov for ten years.

Honours and awards
 Honoured Master of Sports of the USSR
Order of Friendship of Peoples (1981)
Medal "For Labour Valour" (1957)
Medal "For Distinguished Labour" (1970)
Jubilee Medal "In Commemoration of the 100th Anniversary since the Birth of Vladimir Il'ich Lenin" (1970)
 Russian Imperial Family: Knight Commander of the Imperial Order of Saint Stanislaus
Order of Honor

Books

See also
 List of Jewish chess players

Notes

References

Interview in The Day Kasparov Quit by Dirk Jan ten Geuzendam

External links

Interview Part 1, ChessCafe.com
Interview Part 2, ChessCafe.com
Yuri Averbakh (1922-2022), Edward Winter

1922 births
2022 deaths
People from Kaluga
Chess grandmasters
Chess theoreticians
Chess historians
Russian chess players
Soviet chess players
Soviet chess writers
Soviet male writers
20th-century Russian male writers
International Judges of Chess Compositions
Chess composers
Russian chess writers
Chess arbiters
Russian people of German-Jewish descent
Recipients of the Order of Honour (Russia)
Recipients of the Order of Friendship of Peoples
Honoured Masters of Sport of the USSR
Jewish chess players
Competitors at the 1993 Maccabiah Games
Maccabiah Games chess players
Maccabiah Games competitors for Russia
Bauman Moscow State Technical University alumni
Men centenarians
Russian centenarians